Umut Kekıllı  (born 17 April 1984) is a German-Turkish former professional footballer.

Playing career
Kekıllı began his career with Alemannia Aachen's second team before moving to Turkey to play for Kocaelispor.

Personal life
Since 2010, Kekıllı has been in a relationship with German actress Natascha Ochsenknecht.

References

External links
 Profile at TFF.org

1984 births
Footballers from Cologne
German people of Turkish descent
Living people
Turkish footballers
Association football midfielders
FC Viktoria Köln players
Alemannia Aachen players
Kocaelispor footballers
Kartalspor footballers
Konyaspor footballers
Vanspor footballers
Menemenspor footballers
Ofspor footballers
Aydınspor footballers
Oberliga (football) players
Süper Lig players
TFF First League players
TFF Second League players
TFF Third League players